Jasmine Sinclair is an American film and television actress. She is known for playing Angela in Paper Towns, Anna in When the Bough Breaks and Rosalind "Roz" Walker in the Netflix series Chilling Adventures of Sabrina. She will star as Red River Supe Marie Moreau in the Amazon Prime Video series Gen V, set for a 2023 release.

Career 
In 2013, Sinclair starred in the two episodes of HBO's documentary series Masterclass.

In 2014, Sinclair played the role of Kim Carson in one episode of NBC's Revolution. She also played the role of Tasha Williams in three episodes of TNT's Rizzoli & Isles.

In 2015, Sinclair played Angela in the Jake Schreier-directed comedy-drama film Paper Towns, along with Nat Wolff and Cara Delevingne. The film is an adaptation of the novel of same name by John Green, and was released by 20th Century Fox on July 24, 2015.

In 2016, Sinclair starred as Anna, a surrogate mother, in the thriller film When the Bough Breaks, directed by Jon Cassar. The film was released on September 9, 2016 by Screen Gems.

In 2017, Sinclair starred as Beatrice Bennett in the series The Vampire Diaries.

Sinclair played Chloe in the supernatural horror film Slender Man, which was released in theaters on August 10, 2018. On February 5, 2018, Sinclair was cast as Rosalind "Roz" Walker in the Netflix series based on Chilling Adventures of Sabrina.

On March 11, 2021 Sinclair was cast in an Amazon Original spin-off of The Boys, entitled Gen V, photographically first appearing as her character, a Red River Supe named Marie Moreau, in the third season of the former series prior to her debut.

Filmography

Television

Film

Awards and nominations

References

External links 
 

1994 births
Living people
21st-century American actresses
African-American actresses
Actresses from Santa Monica, California
American child actresses
American film actresses
American television actresses
People from Santa Monica, California
21st-century African-American women
21st-century African-American people